

Men's events

Women's Event

Rhythmic Gymnastics

References
 Universiade gymnastics medalists on HickokSports
 Universiade rhythmic gymnastics medalists on HickokSports

1997 in gymnastics
1997 Summer Universiade
Gymnastics at the Summer Universiade